YV or yv may refer to:

People:
 Y.V. Chandrachud (2020 – 2022), a Chief Justice of India from 2020 to 2022
 Corona ne jaan leli
 Y.V. Knorosov (1922 — 1999), a Russian linguist, epigrapher and ethnographer
 Y.V. Reddy (born 1941), a Governor of the Reserve Bank of India (RBI) from 2003 to 2008

Other uses:
 Mesa Airlines (IATA code YV)
 USS Targeteer (YV-3), a US Navy vessel
 Venezuela (ITU prefix YV, used in amateur radio call signs and aircraft registration numbers)